Pools of Darkness is a novel based on the Pools of Darkness computer role-playing game. It was written by James Ward and Anne K. Brown, and published by TSR in February 1992. The novel is set in the Forgotten Realms setting based on the Dungeons & Dragons fantasy role-playing game. This book was the second in a trilogy, preceded by Pool of Radiance and followed by Pool of Twilight.

Plot summary
The city of Phlan has vanished, transported to parts unknown, and its citizens defend themselves from the minions of Bane. Adventurers Ren, Shal, and Tarl band together with the sorceress Evaine to stop them.

Reception
One reviewer commented: "The evil wizard antagonist just seems kinda plopped in there for the sake of having a bad guy.  He wasn't really threatening or scary, more like a child having a prolonged temper tantrum.  The plan of the god he served and the pit fiend that was supposed to serve him seemed kinds tossed in there too, and I'm a little disappointed that the creature from the last book wasn’t there at all."

Reviews
Kliatt

References

1992 American novels
American fantasy novels
Forgotten Realms novels
Novels based on video games